The Church of Our Lady of Lourdes is a parish church in New York City, under the jurisdiction of the Archdiocese of New York, located at 463 West 142nd Street between Convent and Amsterdam Avenues in Manhattan.

History
The parish was established in 1901 under the authority of Michael Corrigan, the Archbishop of New York, to serve the growing Catholic population of the Hamilton Heights neighborhood. Corrigan assigned the task to the Rev. Joseph H. McMahon, who had just served as a curate at St. Patrick's Cathedral for the previous fifteen years.

Description
The church was built in 1902-04 at the cost of $80,000 to the design of Cornelius O'Reilly of the O'Reilly Brothers firm.  The building combined discarded elements of three recently demolished structures, which McMahon was able to obtain at a bargain:

the facade on 142nd Street uses elements of the National Academy of Design building which stood at East 23rd Street and Fourth Avenue (now Park Avenue South), and was designed by Peter B. Wight in a style influenced by Venetian Gothic architecture; it was used in a way to reflect that of the original shrine for that devotion located in Lourdes, France.
the church's apse and part of its eastern wall, including stained-glass windows, were elements removed from James Renwick Jr.'s St. Patrick's Cathedral to allow for the building of the Lady Chapel there; and
the pedestals on either side of the entrance steps came from the mansion of department store magnate A. T. Stewart, called the "Marble Palace", which was designed by John Kellum, and which stood at 34th Street and Fifth Avenue until 1901.

The church, which has been called "one of the oddest buildings in New York", was designated a New York City Landmark on July 22, 1975.

Bricks from the cathedral were used to construct the church

The parish established a school in 1903 which was staffed by the Ursuline nuns. Ten years later a larger school was constructed, which was also served by the Sisters of the Holy Child Jesus.

Current status
Today the parish serves a congregation of African Americans, Dominicans, Ecuadorians, Eritreans and Mexicans, among others.

See also
List of New York City Landmarks

References 

Christian organizations established in 1901
Roman Catholic churches completed in 1904
20th-century Roman Catholic church buildings in the United States
Venetian Gothic architecture in the United States
Gothic Revival architecture in New York City
Roman Catholic churches in Manhattan
Hamilton Heights, Manhattan
Churches in Harlem
New York City Designated Landmarks in Manhattan